Charles de La Rounat, real name Aimé-Nicolas-Charles Rouvenat, (16 April 1818 – 25 December 1884 ) was a 19th-century French writer, playwright, journalist and theatre director.

A director of the Théâtre de l'Odéon from 1856 to 1867, then from 1880 to 1884, he authored several theatre plays and opéra comiques libretti, most of them in collaboration.

The historian  (1867-1939) was his grandson.

Biography 
After studying literature, he was appointed in 1848 by the Provisional Government of 1848 secretary of the Luxembourg Commission presided by Louis Blanc, before turning to theatre. In 1855, he started collaborating with La Revue de Paris. After he was appointed director of the Théâtre de l'Odéon the following year, he successfully set up plays by many young authors but eventually resigned in June 1867 over disagreement with the regulators.

He then returned to journalism, wrote the feuilleton of the newspaper Le Siecle and was appointed government commissioner to subsidized theaters.

After he applied in 1879 for the chair of director of the Paris Opera, which ultimately fell to Auguste Vaucorbeil, he became director of the Odeon February 15, 1880, succeeding Félix Duquesnel.

A fall he made the following winter by going to the Department of Fine Arts caused a coxalgy, of which he died three years later, 25 December 1884. Paul Porel succeeded him at the Odéon.

Plays 
 1849: Les Associés, one-act vaudeville with Armand Montjoye, Théâtre des Variétés
 1850: La Mariée de Poissy, vaudeville with Adolphe d'Ennery, Eugène Grangé, Variétés
 1851: Les Malheurs heureux, comédie en vaudeville with Félix-Auguste Duvert, Augustin-Théodore de Lauzanne de Vauroussel, Variétés
 1851: Une bonne qu'on renvoie, one act vaudeville with Samuel-Henri Berthoud, Variétés
 1853: Pulchriska et Léontino, "pochade" mingled with couplets with Montjoye, Théâtre du Palais-Royal
 1853: Un homme entre deux airs with Alfred Delacour, Montjoye, Palais-Royal
 1854: La Pile de Volta, one-act "pochade" in 1 act mingled with couplets with Paul Siraudin, Palais-Royal
 1855: Une panthère de Java "pochade" with Montjoye, Palais-Royal
 1856: Les Vainqueurs de Lodi, one-act comedy, Théâtre du Gymnase
 1856: Pâquerette, one-act opéra comique with Grangé, music by Jules Duprato, Opéra-Comique
 1871: Marceline, drama in 4 acts, Théâtre du Gymnase
 1877: Les Deux Jardiniers, one-act opéra comique with Théodore de Banville, Opéra-Comique
 1879: La Courte Échelle, three-act opéra comique, music by Edmond Membrée, Opéra-Comique
 1880: Le Beau Solignac, five-act drama with Jules Clarétie, William Busnach, Théâtre du Châtelet

Other 
 1857: La Comédie de l'amour, novel, Michel Lévy frères, Paris
 1884: Études dramatiques. Le théâtre français : Mme Arnould-Plessy, MM. Régnier, Got, Delaunay, Librairie de l'Art Jules Rouam, Paris 
 1886: Souvenirs et poésies diverses, foreword by Francisque Sarcey, Paris

Honours and titles 
 Chevalier of the Legion of Honour (12 August 1864 decree) ;
 officier de la Légion d'honneur au titre du ministère de l'Instruction publique et des Beaux-arts (13 July 1883 decree). Le parrain choisi par Charles de la Rounat est Camille Doucet, secrétaire perpétuel de l'Académie française.

References

Bibliography 
 Pierre Larousse, « Charles Rouvenat de La Rounat », Grand dictionnaire universel du XIXe, tome 10, Paris, 1873, p. 211, at Gallica 

19th-century French dramatists and playwrights
French theatre managers and producers
Chevaliers of the Légion d'honneur
Writers from Paris
1818 births
1884 deaths